Agrotis scruposa is a moth of the family Noctuidae. It is endemic of the Levant and known only from some localities in Turkey and Israel.

Adults are on wing in July to August. There is one generation per year.

External links
 Noctuinae of Israel

Agrotis
Moths of Asia
Moths of the Middle East
Moths described in 1936